Jorge Marticorena Cuba (9 November 1956 – 1 March 2021) was a Peruvian politician. He was District Mayor of Lurín, serving from 2007 to 2014 and again from 2019 until his death in 2021.

Biography
Cuba was born in the Tantara District to Jorge Marticorena Salvatierra and Sebastiana Cuba Violeta.

He was elected to be a Municipal Councillor for the Lurín district from 1990 to 1993. For the 2018 elections, he switched to the party We Are Peru and once again won the seat of District Mayor of Lurín.

Jorge Marticorena contracted COVID-19 during the COVID-19 pandemic in Peru in February 2021. He died on 1 March 2021 at the age of 64, becoming the third district mayor in the Lima metropolitan area to die of the disease, following  and Claudio Marcatoma Ccahuana.

References

1956 births
2021 deaths
20th-century Peruvian politicians
21st-century Peruvian politicians
Deaths from the COVID-19 pandemic in Peru
Inca Garcilaso de la Vega University alumni